Bisect, or similar, may refer to:

Mathematics
 Bisection, in geometry, dividing something into two equal parts
 Bisection method, a root-finding algorithm
 Equidistant set

Other uses
 Bisect (philately), the use of postage stamp halves
 Bisector (music), a half octave in diatonic set theory
 Bisection (software engineering), for finding code changes
 bisection of earthworms to study regeneration